Liam Walsh (born 15 September 1997) is an English footballer who plays as a midfielder for Swansea City. He started his career at Everton and has also spent time on loan at Yeovil Town, for whom he made his Football League debut, and at Birmingham City and Coventry City.

Career

Everton

Born in Huyton, England, Walsh started his career at Everton when he joined them at five years old. In July 2014, Walsh signed a scholarships with the academy. Eight months later, he signed his first professional contract with the club. Walsh progressed through Everton's academy, regularly appearing for the Under-18 and Under-23 sides.

On 1 August 2015, Walsh appeared in the first team for the first time as an unused substitute, in a 2–0 loss against Leeds United. In November 2015, he scored a memorable goal from the halfway line during an Under-18 game against Derby. As a result, he was awarded the club's Goal of the Month for November.

After his loan spell at Yeovil Town ended, Walsh continued to feature for the Under-23 sides in the 2016–17 season. He started the season well when he set up two goals as captain, in a 2–0 win over Bolton Wanderers in the Group Stage of EFL Trophy. He shortly signed a contract extension with the club, keeping him until 2019. Walsh then became a regular in the midfield position for the Under-23 sides, under David Unsworth's side. His number of outstanding performance resulted in him being named Premier League 2 Player of the Month in February 2017. After helping the side win the Premier League 2 title at the end of the season, Walsh was shortlisted for the league's Player of the Year award. Walsh was also called up to the England squad for the U20 World Cup in South Korea but suffered an injury towards the end of the 2016/17 season which meant he was unable to participate.

Loan spells
On 6 January 2016, Walsh joined Football League Two side Yeovil Town on a one-month loan, and made his debut four days later in the FA Cup third round against Carlisle United. He then set up a goal for Jack Compton, who later scored a hat–trick, in a 3–2 win over AFC Wimbledon on 30 January 2016, followed up by scoring his first goal for the club, in a 1–1 draw against Luton Town. The initial loan was extended on two occasions, before extending it until the end of the season. Despite missing out on two occasions, due to illness and suspension, Walsh finished the 2016–17 season, making 17 appearances in all competitions. After his loan spell at Yeovil Town came to an end, Walsh reflected his time there, stating he "became a man."

Walsh signed for Championship club Birmingham City on 31 August 2017, on loan until 3 January 2018. He was one of six debutants in the starting eleven for Birmingham's next fixture, away to Norwich City; he played 57 minutes and was yellow-carded in the first half as his team lost 1–0. He appeared twice more under Harry Redknapp's management, but not at all under successor Steve Cotterill, and returned to train with his parent club in mid-November, although the loan remained in force until its official expiry date.

Bristol City
On 5 January 2018, Walsh signed a two-and-a-half-year contract with Championship club Bristol City, joining for an undisclosed fee. Upon joining the club, Manager Lee Johnson said about Walsh: "I think Liam gives us something slightly different to what we have already and adds to the qualities we already have in midfield. He loves getting on the ball and is a very good passer with both his left and right foot. He's a brilliant player, who can come in and compete immediately. Hopefully he can improve and he improves us." Walsh, himself, felt leaving Everton for Bristol City was a right time for him to leave.

Walsh made his Bristol City debut, coming on as a second–half substitute in the 72nd minutes, in a 2–1 loss against Manchester City in the Semi-final first leg of the EFL Cup. On 13 January 2018, he made his league debut for the club, where he started and played 69 minutes before being substituted, in a 1–0 loss against Norwich City. However, Walsh spent the rest of the season being featured in and out of the first team. At the end of the 2017–18 season, he went on to make eight appearances for the side in all competitions.

He scored his first goal for City in an EFL Cup tie against Queens Park Rangers on 13 August 2019.

On 2 September 2019, Walsh signed for League One side Coventry City on loan until the end of the season. His performances for Coventry during the 2019–20 season, led to Walsh being named in the League One PFA Team of the Year.

On 14 May 2021, Walsh was released by Bristol City following the expiration of his contract.

Swansea City
On 8 July 2021, Walsh joined Swansea City on a free transfer, signing a three-year deal with the club.

Hull City (loan)
On 31 January 2022, Walsh joined Hull City on loan until the end of the 2021–22 season. He made his debut on 8 February 2022, in the away match against Derby County.

International career
Walsh is eligible to play for England and Italy.

After representing England U16 side in 2012, Walsh was called up by England U18 for the first time on 16 September 2014. He made his England U18 debut on 24 September 2014, where he started the whole game, in a 2–0 loss against Italy U18. Walsh went on to make appearance for England U18 side.

Career statistics

Personal life
Walsh attended Cardinal Heenan Catholic High School in West Derby and Wade Deacon High School in Widnes. Apart from his father, Walsh's family are Everton supporters.

Honours
Individual
PFA Team of the Year: 2019–20 League One

References

External links

1997 births
Living people
English footballers
England youth international footballers
Association football midfielders
Everton F.C. players
Yeovil Town F.C. players
Birmingham City F.C. players
Bristol City F.C. players
Coventry City F.C. players
Swansea City A.F.C. players
Hull City A.F.C. players
English Football League players